The women's 1500 metres event was held on February 4. 11 athletes participated. The final was held from 15:05–16:22.

Schedule
All times are Almaty Time (UTC+06:00)

Records

Results

References

Women 1500